Endotricha variabilis is a species of snout moth in the genus Endotricha. It was described by Anthonie Johannes Theodorus Janse in 1924, and is known from the Moluccas.

References

Endotrichini
Moths described in 1924